Judith Arcana is an American writer of poems, stories, essays and books. She was a teacher for forty years and her writing has appeared in journals and anthologies since the early 1980s. She has been an activist for reproductive justice since spending two years in the Jane Collective, Chicago's underground abortion service (1970–72). Arcana is notable for her insistence on the organically political nature of art and literature.

Personal life
Born February 5, 1943 in Cleveland, Ohio, she is the daughter of Anne Solomon and Norman Rosenfield. Following the death of Anne Rosenfield in March 1944, Norman Rosenfield married Ida Epstein in July 1945. Mothering, perhaps as a consequence of her mother's death, has been one of Arcana's primary subjects. She currently lives in Portland, Oregon.

Career

Judith Arcana's first teaching job was at the high school she graduated from, Niles Township High School (East Division) in Illinois. She did her student teaching there in spring of 1964 and returned in the fall as a full time teacher. She taught at Niles until the spring of 1970, when the school board fired her – despite tenure – along with two other teachers (John Palm and Nancy Tripp). The three were considered radically innovative, and even dangerous, by the school board.

Her last teaching job was at the Union Graduate School (which has since morphed into the Union Institute & University). She began work there as a dean in early 1989 and left, as faculty emerita, in the early 2000s. At Union, Arcana was a dean in the Graduate College, Founding Director of the Center for Women, adviser to interdisciplinary doctoral students, and a convener of residential colloquium and seminars.

Judith Arcana is an experienced speaker and performer of her work with TV/radio experience and years of performances at bookstores, colleges and community events. She has received awards and grants from Oregon Literary Arts, the Barbara Deming Memorial Fund/Money for Women, the Puffin Foundation, the Rockefeller Archive Center and the doctoral faculty of the Union Graduate School, as well as residencies and fellowships from Ragdale, Soapstone, the Montana Artists Refuge, the Mesa Refuge and the Helene Wurlitzer Foundation.

She has taught literature, writing and interdisciplinary topics in Women's Studies in high schools, colleges, libraries, living rooms, a state prison and a county jail. She holds a PhD in Literature (Loyola University of Chicago 1989), an MA in Women's Studies (Goddard College 1979), an Urban Preceptorship in Preventive Medicine (University of Illinois Medical School 1973) and a BA in English (Northwestern University 1964).

In 2008-2009, Arcana collaborated with Ash Creek Press in Portland, Oregon to publish The Ash Creek Series: an elegant signed/numbered edition folding broadside of five short poems (POEMS), a manuscript in a cartoon envelope – perhaps her most autobiographical work so far (Family Business), and 4th Period English, a chapbook of poems about immigration and related themes, spoken primarily in the voices of high school students.

Arcana is featured in the feminist history film She's Beautiful When She's Angry.

She is the consulting producer on the 2018 historical drama film Ask for Jane, in addition to making a cameo appearance. The film is based on the Jane Collective.

Writing

Arcana's poetry collection What if your mother (2005) offers poems and monologues examining a constellation of motherhood themes including abortion, adoption, miscarriage and the biotechnology of childbirth, as well as the daily experience of mothering.
In her review of the collection in Affilia (see references), Merle Hoffman describes Arcana's poems as "maps of interior psychological and physiological journeys" that meet the unnamed experience (abortion) "with bold lyricism, passion, and creative imagery."

Her two prose books about motherhood – Our Mothers’ Daughters (1979) and Every Mother’s Son (1983)  – are radical feminist analysis; both have been read, taught and discussed for many years in the US, Canada and the UK. Grace Paley’s Life Stories, A Literary Biography (1993), is Judith's study of the well-loved & much admired writer/activist who died in August 2007. The initial interviews, research and draft for that book comprise her doctoral dissertation.

Published works

Book-length
What if your mother, Goshen: Chicory Blue Press, 2005 
Grace Paley's Life Stories, A Literary Biography, Champaign: University of Illinois Press, 1994, 1993 
 Every Mother's Son, US and UK: The Women's Press, 1996, 1992; Seattle: Seal Press, 1986; London: The Women's Press, 1983; New York: Doubleday, 1983, 
 Our Mothers' Daughters, US and UK: The Women's Press, 1996, 1992; Berkeley: Shameless Hussy Press, 1986, 1979; London: The Women's Press,

Other
A Two-Judith Conversation- ECLECTICA Magazine, Volume 13, #3 - summer 2009
 4th Period English (Ash Creek Series) 2009 
 Correspondence and The Man Who Loves Trees + What the birds say, Writers Dojo (online) end of January 2009
 A Matter of Fact  Feminist studies, Fall 2008
 There are no stars and If I Tell You and Not in China Thresholds, Fall/Winter 2008
 One rosy brown egg  Oregonian 10/5/08
 You May Have Heard About My Situation and guest editor essay Persimmon Tree (online) Fall 2008 
 Crows, Junctures 2008
 POEMS - folded broadside, signed/numbered edition (Ash Creek Series) 2008
 Family Business - chapbook ms in envelope (Ash Creek Series) 2008
 Midrash on Falling, Bridges spring 2008
 Facts of Life and tiny essay Letters to the World, 2008
 Past Lives Passager winter 2008
 In the cards blossombones (online) #1, 2008 
 Lois, Questions blossombones (online) #1, 2008* The Woman Sitting Next to Death blossombones (online) #1, 2008 
 Remembering Grace off our backs, Vol 37, #2/3 2008
 Whenever I Come to It Walking Bridges Using Poetry as a Compass, late 2007 + Bridges 12/2-Fall
 Eight + tiny essay in Umbrella, late 2007 (online)
 Laughing and Thinking at the Same Time Persimmon Tree (online) 12/15/07
 folio of poems, Young Mothers issue, ARM Journal 9/1, 2007
 Celia Young Mothers issue of ARM Journal 9/1, late 2007
 For All the Mary Catholics White Ink, late 2007
 Felony Booking White Ink, late 2007
 National and Public  Bridges, fall 2007 (12/2)
 Anecdotal Evidence of the Effects of Women’s Liberation on Male Children 5AM, Summer 2007 (#26)
 Maggie Answers Aunt Sylvia’s Question Persimmon Tree, June 2007 Persimmontree Magazine | 23 | Fall 2012
 The Elders Repeat Themselves Umbrella, Summer 2007
 Not Like That Umbrella, Summer 2007
 Musee des Beaux Arts (further west, later on, for David) Studio, 2007 1/1
 A child said what is the grass Studio, 2007 1/1 
 The Man Who Loves Trees Studio, 2007 1/1
 86 in Diner, 2007 Volume 6
 Snow, Fall Not What I Expected, 2007
 Birth Days Passager Winter, 2007 (& on their website spring/summer 2007)

References

Dunlop, Rishma. What if your mother (review), NWSA Journal 19.2 (Summer 2007) 251-53.
Hoffman, Merle. What if your mother (review), Affilia 21.3 (2006) 351-52.
Schott, Penelope Scambly. Bridges: A Jewish Feminist Journal 11.1 (Spring 2006) 122-24.

External links
 
Judith Arcana, She's Beautiful When She's Angry (website for the film)

American women poets
American essayists
American women essayists
American women short story writers
American short story writers
American feminists
Jewish American writers
Jewish poets
Living people
1943 births
Writers from Cleveland
Goddard College alumni
Loyola University Chicago alumni
Northwestern University alumni
Writers from Portland, Oregon
21st-century American Jews
21st-century American women